The Istituto Superiore Mario Boella (ISMB) is a center for applied research in the fields of telecommunication engineering and information and communication technologies located in Turin, Italy.

It was founded in 2000 by Intesa Sanpaolo SpA and the Polytechnic University of Turin. The institute comprises more than 150 researchers collaborating closely with the academia, industries and the government organizations such as the European Union.

References

Research institutes in Italy